Liesbeth Esselink (born 14 August 1965), known by her stage name Solex, is a Dutch musician based in Amsterdam. Her music is a light-hearted amalgamation of pop music, electronica and sampling.

Overview
After singing in a new wave band and performing as a member of the Dutch indie/noise pop group Sonetic Vet, Esselink began the Solex project in order to give herself a more complete and fulfilling musical outlet. The name is taken from the French moped manufacturer Solex.

Utilizing the records in her own record store, she assembled her music on an antique 8-track recorder, singing original lyrics over her musical creations. The first album, Solex vs. the Hitmeister, was cobbled together using samples from albums that Esselink had been unable to sell in her store. Later albums would see her assembling tracks with samples she had informally recorded at live performances in addition to sampling records from her collection. 

In 2001, Solex released the album Low Kick And Hard Bop on the Matador label. She appeared on Gerling's album Head3cleaner/When Young Terrorists Chase the Sun that year, and she also appeared on The Go! Team's 2007 album Proof of Youth.

Personal life
Esselink was raised in Voorschoten. Her father was a chemical engineer and her mother a painter.

Discography

Albums
Solex vs. the Hitmeister (1998, Matador Records)
Pick Up (1999, Matador Records)
Low Kick and Hard Bop (2001, Matador Records)
The Laughing Stock of Indie Rock (2004, Arena Rock Recording Company)
In the Fishtank 13 (2005, In the Fishtank) – Solex with Maarten Altena Ensemble (M.A.E.); as a part of the In the Fishtank project
Amsterdam Throwdown King Street Showdown! (2010, BronzeRat Records) – Solex, Cristina Martinez and Jon Spencer
Solex Ahoy! The Sound Map of the Netherlands (2013, BronzeRat Records / Seriés Aphōnos)

EPs
Athens, Ohio (2000, Matador Records)
 Solex (2005, JeBu Records)

Singles
Solex All Licketysplit/Solex West, (1998, Matador Records)

References

External links
Official site
Solex on Keeping It Peel (BBC's John Peel memorial site)
Solex at Matador Records
Solex at Arena Rock Recording Co.
[ Solex on Allmusic]

1965 births
Living people
People from Delft
People from Voorschoten
Dutch electronic musicians
Arena Rock Recording Company artists